The 1981 McNeese State Cowboys football team represented McNeese State University as a member of the Southland Conference during the 1981 NCAA Division I-A football season. Led by Ernie Duplechin in his third and final season as head coach, the Cowboys compiled an overall record of 7–3–1 with a mark of 3–1–1 in conference play, placing second in the Southland.

Schedule

References

McNeese State
McNeese Cowboys football seasons
McNeese State Cowboys football